Alxa Right Banner (Mongolian:   , Cyrillic: 
Алшаа баруун хошуу, Alaša Baraɣun qosiɣu) is a banner in the southwest of Inner Mongolia, China, bordering Gansu province to the south and southwest. It is under the administration of Alxa League. The banner is served by the Alxa Right Banner Badanjilin Airport.

Climate

References

www.xzqh.org 

Banners of Inner Mongolia
Alxa League